Marco Aurélio Borges (born 5 January 1978) is a Brazilian Paralympic athlete. He won the silver medal in the men's shot put F57 event at the 2020 Summer Paralympics in Tokyo, Japan. At the time, he won the bronze medal but this became the silver medal after Thiago Paulino dos Santos, also from Brazil, dropped from first to third place.

References

Living people
1978 births
Athletes from São Paulo
Brazilian male shot putters
Paralympic athletes of Brazil
Athletes (track and field) at the 2008 Summer Paralympics
Athletes (track and field) at the 2012 Summer Paralympics
Athletes (track and field) at the 2020 Summer Paralympics
Medalists at the 2020 Summer Paralympics
Paralympic silver medalists for Brazil
Paralympic medalists in athletics (track and field)
20th-century Brazilian people
21st-century Brazilian people